20 is a compilation album by American girl group TLC. It was released on October 15, 2013, by Epic and LaFace Records, marking both the group's 20-plus year legacy in entertainment business and the release of their biographical VH1 original film, CrazySexyCool: The TLC Story, which largely inspired the track listing for 20. Many of their hits are featured, including their four number-one singles: "Creep", "Waterfalls", "No Scrubs", and "Unpretty", as well as "Meant to Be", a new track co-written by singer Ne-Yo. Most of the tracks are featured in the original radio format, like on their previous compilation album Now and Forever: The Hits, and "No Scrubs" is featured in its original radio version with an accompanying rap of Left Eye.

Commercial performance
The album peaked at number 12 on the Billboard 200 the week after the premiere of the VH1 original film CrazySexyCool: The TLC Story, becoming the group's highest-charting greatest hits collection in the United States. The album stayed on the Billboard 200 for a total of six weeks. The album also peaked at number two on Billboards Top R&B/Hip-Hop Albums chart.

Track listing

Notes
  signifies a co-producer
  signifies a vocal producer

Sample credits
 "Ain't 2 Proud 2 Beg" samples "Escape-ism" by James Brown, "Jungle Boogie" by Kool & the Gang, and "School Boy Crush" by Average White Band.
 "Hat 2 da Back" samples "Big Ole Butt" by LL Cool J and "What Makes You Happy" by KC and the Sunshine Band.
 "Creep" contains a sample of "Hey Young World" as performed by Slick Rick.

Charts

Weekly charts

Year-end charts

References

2013 compilation albums
Albums produced by Babyface (musician)
Albums produced by Dallas Austin
Albums produced by Jermaine Dupri
Albums produced by L.A. Reid
Albums produced by Manuel Seal
Albums produced by Organized Noize
Epic Records compilation albums
LaFace Records compilation albums
TLC (group) compilation albums